9P (or the Plan 9 Filesystem Protocol or Styx) is a network protocol developed for the Plan 9 from Bell Labs distributed operating system as the means of connecting the components of a Plan 9 system. Files are key objects in Plan 9. They represent windows, network connections, processes, and almost anything else available in the operating system.

9P was revised for the 4th edition of Plan 9 under the name 9P2000, containing various improvements. Some of the improvements made are the removal of certain filename restrictions, the addition of a 'last modifier' metadata field for directories, and authentication files. The latest version of the Inferno operating system also uses 9P2000. The Inferno file protocol was originally called Styx, but technically it has always been a variant of 9P.

A server implementation of 9P for Unix, called u9fs, is included in the Plan 9 distribution. A 9P OS X client kernel extension is provided by Mac9P. A kernel client driver implementing 9P with some extensions for Linux is part of the v9fs project. 9P and its derivatives have also found application in embedded environments, such as the Styx on a Brick project.

Server applications 
Many of Plan 9's applications take the form of 9P file servers. Examples include:
 acme: a text editor/development environment
 rio: the Plan 9 windowing system
 plumber: interprocess communication
 ftpfs: an FTP client that presents the files and directories on a remote FTP server in the local namespace
 wikifs: a wiki editing tool that presents a remote wiki as files in the local namespace
 webfs: a file server that retrieves data from URLs and presents the contents and details of responses as files in the local namespace

Outside of Plan 9, the 9P protocol is still used when a lightweight remote filesystem is required:
 NixOS: a purely functional and declarative Linux distribution can rebuild itself inside a virtual machine, where the client uses 9P to mount the package store directory of the host.
 Windows Subsystem for Linux: since Windows 10 version 1903, the subsystem implements 9P as a server and the host Windows operating system acts as a client.
 Crostini: a custom 9P server is used to provide access to files outside of a Linux VM 
 QEMU: the VirtFS device allows for filesystem sharing over 9P, which is accelerated with kernel drivers and shared memory 
DIOD: Distributed I/O Daemon - a 9P file server

See also 
 Distributed file system

References

External links 
9P Resources page at cat-v.org
9P Manual
The Styx Architecture for Distributed Systems by Rob Pike and Dennis Ritchie
The Organization of Networks in Plan 9 by Dave Presotto and Phil Winterbottom
Security in Plan 9

Application layer protocols
Inferno (operating system)
Inter-process communication
Internet Protocol based network software
Network file systems
Network file transfer protocols
Network protocols
Plan 9 from Bell Labs